Sabbath is a regular (usually weekly) time of rest, worship or special activity, observed by several religions and traditions.

Sabbath may also refer to:

Religion
Shabbat in Judaism
Sabbath in Christianity
Jumu'ah in Islam

Art and entertainment
The Witches' Sabbath or The Sabbath (1988), a drama film
Sabbath (Doctor Who), a Doctor Who villain
Mickey Sabbath, a character in Sabbath's Theater by Philip Roth

Other
Witches' Sabbath

See also

Sabat (surname)
Sabbat (disambiguation)
Shabash (disambiguation)
Shabat, a surname
Shabtai (disambiguation)